The Gilded Ones is a 2021 young adult fantasy novel by Sierra Leonean American writer Namina Forna. Forna's debut novel, it was published on February 9, 2021, and quickly entered the New York Times Best Seller list and Indie Bestseller lists.

Development 
Forna stated that as a child she heard stories about strong women, such as Mami Wata, the goddess of water, and the Dahomey Amazons. She also heard stories about African civilization such as the Walls of Benin and Great Zimbabwe told to her by her grandmother and father to distract her from the Sierra Leone civil war. She later found that western literature lacked African characters and black female heroes, and she was driven to change this.

She stated in an interview that she first got the idea when she had a recurring dream of a girl in a golden armor walking in a field while she was still an undergraduate at Spelman College before writing the novel years later using elements of West African mythology and Sierra Leonean culture.

The book is the first in a planned trilogy called The Gilded Ones series, originally titled the Deathless series before publication. It was acquired by Delacorte Press, an imprint of Random House Children's Books, in a six-figure deal after several rejections from publishers.

Plot 
The novel is set in the West Africa-inspired kingdom of Otera, where 16-year-old Deka lives in the village of Irfut with her sick father, her mother having recently died of a redpox infection. Deka is filled with fear and anxiety because of a compulsory ritual for 16-year-old girls called the Ritual of Purity that serves to banish girls who bleed gold when cut instead of red from society. The ceremony is attacked by deathshrieks – legendary monsters who scream loudly. Deka chases the creatures away and after several attempts to kill her, her worst nightmare comes to life when she bleeds gold and is deemed impure.

She is thrown into a dungeon of torture, where she is killed several times but keeps waking up alive for months, until she is offered an invitation by a mysterious woman called White Hands who wishes to take her to the capital to join an army of Alaki – impure girls like herself, who are trained to fight deathshrieks for the Emperor. Deka agrees and along with a girl named Britta joins the army.

Deka trains hard and learns more about the kingdom and deathshrieks. Soon she discovers she can communicate with the creatures, begins to question the emperor's original intentions and seeks to know more about the true origin of the war.

Reception 
The novel received several positive reactions from literary critics. it entered the New York Times and Indie bestseller lists. A review from Publishers Weekly said of the novel: "Abundant action drives the pace, while a nuanced plot advocates social change by illustrating the myriad ways in which society cages and commodifies women." The Guardian review of the book states: "Action combines with an intense feminist story of sisterhood, where strength is found in female friendships and alliances." Another review from Tor.com praised the lead character stating that "in Deka, Forna offers a driven and determined main character who wades through intense trauma and violence and comes out the other side fueled with righteous fury".

Film adaptation 
A week after the release of the novel, Deadline Hollywood announced that it had been optioned for a film adaptation by the independent film production company Makeready. It will be produced by Brad Weston, Negin Salmasi and Misha Green, the latter of whom is known for her work on Love Craft Country. Forna has also signed to write the script for the film adaptation.

References 

2021 American novels
2021 debut novels
2021 fantasy novels
African-American young adult novels
American bildungsromans
American fantasy novels
American young adult novels
Debut fantasy novels
Delacorte Press books
Literature by African-American women
Novels set in Africa